Maralyan or Maral’yan may refer to:
Aşağı Maralyan, Azerbaijan
Yuxarı Maralyan, Azerbaijan